Botanic Gardens was an early inner suburban railway station in Melbourne, Australia. It was a small station built to serve both the Melbourne Cricket Ground and Royal Botanic Gardens. The station was located near the narrow humpback footbridge from Yarra Park to Swan Street

It was opened  on 3 February 1859 by the Melbourne and Suburban Railway Company, three weeks after the opening of their line to Richmond, which was later extended as the Hawthorn and Windsor lines.

As it was one of the first stations in Melbourne to close, details of it are sparse. It opened only for traffic on Wednesdays afternoons, Saturdays and Sundays. It closed around 1862, although an exact date is not known. Following its closure, the area was served by trams for many years, until Jolimont railway station was opened nearby.

References

Disused railway stations in Melbourne
Railway stations in Australia opened in 1859
Railway stations closed in 1862